Indian Branch is a stream in Laurens County in the U.S. state of Georgia. It is a tributary to Pughes Creek.

Indian Branch was so named for the Native American Indians which once dwelt in the area.

References

Rivers of Georgia (U.S. state)
Rivers of Laurens County, Georgia